Banaru or Benarow may refer to:
 Banaru, Sistan and Baluchestan
 Banaru, Zanjan